Square One Shopping Centre, or simply Square One, is a shopping mall located in Mississauga, Ontario, Canada. It is the largest shopping centre in Ontario and the second largest shopping centre in Canada, after the West Edmonton Mall. On average, the mall serves over 24 million customers each year. The shopping centre also has many condominiums near it.

Square One is located in downtown Mississauga adjacent to the interchange of Highway 403 and Hurontario Street, near the Mississauga Civic Centre, the Mississauga Living Arts Centre and the Mississauga Central Library. Located within the mall grounds is the main terminal of MiWay (formerly Mississauga Transit) bus network, which opened in 1997, and a Peel Regional Police station, which opened in 2002.

History

Excavation of the Square One site began in 1969. Construction was finished in 1973, where the mall was first opened to the public. The four original anchors included Woolco, Sears at the time Simpson-Sears, The Bay, and Dominion.

Some stores such as Ashbrook's and Mark & Spencer's were closed in the late 1990s order to make way for the Cityside expansion, which was completed in the early 2000s.

In 1999, Eaton's filed for bankruptcy, closing their location at Square One. Zellers took over the space in 2000.

During January 2011, Target acquired the leases of most Zellers stores, including their location at Square One. Zellers closed in June 2012 and the store was renovated into a Target, which opened to the public on March 30, 2013.

In January 2013, Square One started a major renovation on the main corridor from the Target store to the centre court/food court. Burger King and Bowring were forced to close down due to the expansion of the food court across from the existing food court. The scenic elevator, along with the fountain, were removed and replaced with two escalators. This renovation was completed in Fall 2013. Square One also expanded by adding its concept, Grand Centre Court, which added at least square feet extra.

Sears Canada announced on June 14, 2013 that it would be closing its store at Square One and Yorkdale as of March 9, 2014. On June 27, Empire Theatres announced that they would be selling their theatre at Square One to Landmark Cinemas, which closed one year later.

It was announced on December 6, 2013 that La Maison Simons would take over most of the space occupied by Sears, with a flagship store which opened in Spring 2016.

In January 2015, Target Canada announced that it would close all their stores, including their location at Square One. Target's location at Square One closed in April 2015.

The South Expansion was completed on March 1, 2016 adding numerous retailers and a Holt Renfrew anchor store, along with removing the Dollarama and Home Outfitters stores.

In June 2018, Square One announced the West Expansion, which took place in the former Target location that closed in 2015. The expansion opened between Fall 2018 and Spring 2019 and added several brands like Uniqlo and The Rec Room, as well as a 34,000 sq. ft. local food emporium, The Food District.

Chapters closed in January 2019 and reopened as Indigo in the West Expansion in February 2019.

The Uniqlo at Square One opened on November 2, 2018.

Square One has had many anchor stores throughout its history:

Current
 Holt Renfrew (2016-present)
 Hudson's Bay (1973-present)
 Simons (2016-present, formerly Sears)
 Sport Chek (2016-present, formerly Sears)
 Uniqlo (2018-present, formerly Eaton's/Zellers/Target)
 Walmart (1994-present, formerly Woolco)

Former
 Eaton's (1973–1999) closed 1999; replaced with Zellers the following year.
 Zellers (Store 279) (2000–2012) - took over Eaton's; replaced with Target the following year after its closure.
 Sears - 1973 as Simpsons Sears – March 9, 2014; replaced with Simons and SportChek.
 Ashbrook's - closed around the late 1990s; currently part of Cityside Expansion.
 Marks & Spencer - closed late 1990s.
 Dominion (1973–1986) - original anchor; closed and demolished during the 1980s. Now mall space.
 Target (2013–2015) - replaced Zellers; closed April 2015. A portion of this space is now used by Indigo, The Rec Room, and Food District (Western Expansion).
 Woolco (1973–1994) - Woolco was acquired by Walmart, which replaces it.
 HMV

Future Hurontario LRT Connection 
The Hurontario LRT will run along the Hurontario corridor, starting from Brampton and running along 18 stops to Mississauga. The LRT will have an intermediate stop at City Centre and connect to the MiWay City Centre Bus Terminal, as well as the Square One GO Bus Terminal.

References
Square One Condos located in Mississauga City Centre

External links

 Official website
 Square One Mississauga

Shopping malls in the Regional Municipality of Peel
Buildings and structures in Mississauga
Shopping malls established in 1973
Oxford Properties
Tourist attractions in Mississauga
1973 establishments in Ontario